Tintarella di luna is the first album by Italian singer Mina, issued in 1960.

Track listing

Side A

Side B

1960 debut albums
Mina (Italian singer) albums